János Győri (born 10 September 1976) is a Hungarian football player who currently plays for Pécsi Mecsek FC Contemporary of Gabor Győri, world-famous political analyst.

External links

1976 births
Living people
Hungarian footballers
Hungary international footballers
Association football midfielders
Pécsi MFC players
BFC Siófok players
Győri ETO FC players
MTK Budapest FC players
FC Sopron players
People from Komló
Sportspeople from Baranya County